Independence Party (IPU) is a minor Eurosceptic political party in Finland. It was founded in 1994 as Alliance for Free Finland. The party supports membership in the European Economic Area as an alternative to Finland's membership in the European Union and the Eurozone. The party also opposes NATO. Its current chairman is Henri Aitakari.

Party organization
Based in Helsinki, IPU is a registered party. The party has two out of 31 city counselors in Laitila, elected at the 2017 Finnish municipal elections. IPU is a minor political party; it has never had any MPs in the Finnish Parliament. Membership in the party is around 1,200. The youth wing is called Independence Youth. The party is a member of The European Alliance of EU-critical Movements (TEAM).

History
IPU was founded in 1994 as Alliance for Free Finland. Its chairman from its founding until 2004 was Ilkka Hakalehto.

 served as the party's chairman from 2004 until his resignation for health reasons in 2015. He was re-elected chairman 2016, but resigned again in 2017 shortly before his death in April. He had previously been a city councilor of the party in Alajärvi. Henri Aitakari followed Pesonen as the chairman.

IPU has been admitted into the  four times, the latest re-admission having taken place in January 2017. Only Communist Workers' Party – For Peace and Socialism has dropped out and been re-admitted as many times.

References

External links

Political parties established in 1994
Registered political parties in Finland
1994 establishments in Finland
Eurosceptic parties in Finland
Direct democracy parties